Vinyl bromide is a simple vinyl halide. It is a colorless liquid.  It is produced from ethylene dibromide.  It is mainly used as a comonomer to confer fire retardant properties to acrylate polymers.

Reactions and applications
It reacts with magnesium to give the corresponding Grignard reagent.

Safety precautions 
Vinyl bromide is listed in List of IARC Group 2A carcinogens as a suspected human carcinogen.

See also 
 Vinyl chloride
 Allyl bromide
 Bromoethane

References

External links 

MSDS at Oxford University
MSDS at mathesontrigas.com
Vinyl bromide at IRIS
Vinyl bromide at osha.gov
IARC Summary & Evaluation of vinyl bromide
Report on Carcinogens Background Document for Vinyl Bromide
Synthesis of vinyl bromides
The Kinetics of Pyrolysis of Vinyl Bromide
UV absorption spectra
UV Spectrum and Cross Sections
1H NMR spectrum

Organobromides
Vinyl compounds
IARC Group 2A carcinogens